Margarita Fútbol Club is a Venezuelan football team based in Pampatar, Nueva Esparta. Margarita currently play in the Venezuelan Segunda División, the second division in Venezuelan football. The club was founded in 2011, and plays their home games at Estadio Ciudad, a 4,500 seat stadium in Pampatar.

History 

Margarita was founded as an initiative of current club president, Leonel Cannelloni. Cannelloni founded the club in 2011.

Crest 

The club's crest co consists of two quarters: a background of golden rays alternated by contrasts with the initials of the club. The lower half is presented in half-contrasting vertical blue. The low half contains a wreath which is dedicated the Virgen del Valle. The three stars symbolize the three islands that make up the state of Nueva Esparta ( Margarita, Coche and Cubagua ) .

References

External links 
 Club Twitter
 Club Instagram
 Facebook Page

Association football clubs established in 2011
Football clubs in Venezuela
2011 establishments in Venezuela
Pampatar